The 1988 Tour de France was the 75th edition of Tour de France, one of cycling's Grand Tours. The Tour began in Pornichet with a prelude stage of team and individual time trials on 3 July, and Stage 12 occurred on 14 July with a mountainous stage from Morzine. The race finished on the Champs-Élysées in Paris on 24 July.

Stage 12
14 July 1988 — Morzine to Alpe d'Huez,

Stage 13
15 July 1988 — Grenoble to Villard-de-Lans,  (individual time trial)

Stage 14
17 July 1988 — Blagnac to Guzet-Neige,

Stage 15
18 July 1988 — Saint-Girons to Luz Ardiden,

Stage 16
19 July 1988 — Luz Ardiden to Pau,

Stage 17
19 July 1988 — Pau to Bordeaux,

Stage 18
20 July 1988 — Ruelle-sur-Touvre to Limoges,

Stage 19
21 July 1988 — Limoges to Puy de Dôme,

Stage 20
22 July 1988 — Clermont-Ferrand to Chalon-sur-Saône,

Stage 21
23 July 1988 — Santenay to Santenay,  (individual time trial)

Stage 22
24 July 1988 — Nemours to Paris Champs-Élysées,

References

1988 Tour de France
Tour de France stages